The A-train (from Afternoon Train) is a satellite constellation of four Earth observation satellites of varied nationality in sun-synchronous orbit at an altitude that is slightly variable for each satellite.

The orbit, at an inclination of 98.14°, crosses the equator each day at around 1:30 pm solar time, giving the constellation its name (the "A" stands for "afternoon") and crosses the equator again on the night side of the Earth, at around 1:30 am.

They are spaced a few minutes apart from each other so their collective observations may be used to build high-definition three-dimensional images of Earth's atmosphere and surface.

Satellites

Active

The train, consists of three active satellites:
 OCO-2, lead spacecraft in formation, replaces the failed OCO and was launched for NASA on July 2, 2014.
 GCOM-W1 "SHIZUKU", follows OCO-2 by 11 minutes, launched by JAXA on May 18, 2012.
 Aura, a multi-national satellite, lags OCO-2 by 19 minutes, launched for NASA on July 15, 2004.

Past
 PARASOL, launched by CNES on December 18, 2004 and moved to another (lower) orbit on December 2, 2009. PARASOL was deactivated in 2013
 CloudSat, launched with CALIPSO on April 28, 2006 and moved to another (lower) orbit on February 22, 2018. Now part of the C-train.
 CALIPSO, launched on April 28, 2006, is a joint effort of CNES and NASA. It follows CloudSat by no more than 8.5 seconds. CALIPSO was moved to CloudSat's new orbit in September 2018. Now part of the C-train.
 Aqua, used to run 4 minutes behind GCOM-W1, launched for NASA on May 4, 2002. In January 2022, it descended from the A-Train to save fuel and now is in a free-drift mode, wherein its equatorial crossing time is slowly drifting to later times.

Failed
 OCO, destroyed by a launch vehicle failure on February 24, 2009, and was replaced by OCO-2.
 Glory, failed during launch on a Taurus XL rocket on March 4, 2011, and would have flown between CALIPSO and Aura.

References

External links
 NASA A-Train Portal
 NASA satellite program impacted
 NASA Program Page
 Orbital Sciences Program Page
 

Earth observation satellites
Satellite constellations